Mullalyup is a town in the South West region of Western Australia, situated between Kirup and Balingup on the South Western Highway,  south of Perth. The town is in the shire of Donnybrook-Balingup, known for its scenic Blackwood River Valley and agricultural industries.

The name is taken from the nearby Mullalyup Brook, and was first noted by John Forrest in 1866.  It is Noongar in origin, and apparently means "nose place", as the place where nose-piercing was performed as part of the initiation cycle of young men.

The first Europeans to settle in the area were the Coverley family who took land close to the town and named their farm "Elm Grove". The first major building in the town was the Blackwood Inn, built in 1882 by John Coverley for Thomas Maslin.

During the 1890s the town was included as a siding in the construction of the railway line from Donnybrook to Bridgetown.

The town site was gazetted in 1901.

References

Towns in Western Australia
Places of Noongar significance